Hawaii Nui Brewing Company is a brewery in Hilo on the Island of Hawaii, Hawaii, United States.  It was established in 2007 by Keith Kinsey, Andrew Baker and Nina Lytton. Hawai'i Nui Brewing acquired Keoki Brewing Company in May 2007. In January 2009, Hawaii Nui Brewing acquired Mehana Brewing Company and consolidated operations to Hilo, Hawai'i, It sells Hawaii Nui, Keoki  and Mehana labels of beers.  
Keoki Brewing Company was located in Līhue on the island of Kauai, and made Primo Island Lager draught beer under license from Pabst Brewing Company from October 2007 until November 2010.

In April 2013, Hawai'i Nui Brewing applied for Chapter 11 bankruptcy reorganization.

Mehana Brewing Company was incorporated in 1995 by Dustin Shindo with Calvin Shindo general manager. The Shindo family had previously operated a soft drink company. It has a tasting room located on East Kawili Street in Hilo.

See also
 List of breweries in Hawaii

References

External links
 

2007 establishments in Hawaii
Beer brewing companies based in Hawaii
Companies that filed for Chapter 11 bankruptcy in 2013
Food and drink companies established in 2007
Hawaiian cuisine
Hawaii (island)